Heiða Kristin Helgadóttir (born 20 April 1983) is an Icelandic politician and entrepreneur. She founded and led the Best Party and Bright Future.

Early life and education
Helgadóttir was born in Washington, D.C. in the United States. She earned a BA in political science from the University of Iceland.

Career
After graduating from university, Helgadóttir worked in an artificial intelligence laboratory. While there her friend Gaukur Úlfarsson introduced her to comedian Jón Gnarr. Amid the Icelandic financial crisis  they created the Best Party in 2009 with the original intention to parody political practices in Iceland. In 2010, Helgadóttir ran the Best Party's campaign in Reykjavik's election, resulting in a shock win which made Gnarr mayor of the city. During Gnarr's tenure as Reykjavik mayor, which ended in 2014, Helgadóttir was his close confidante and advisor and served as CEO of the Best Party.

In 2012, Helgadóttir founded the political party Bright Future, the successor to the Best Party, with Guðmundur Steingrímsson. She served as chairman of the party from its founding through December 2014. In the Bright Future's first election in April 2013, the party received 8.2% of the general vote, giving it six out of the 63 seats in Iceland's parliament. In 2015, Helgadóttir served as a parliamentarian for Bright Future in place of her colleague Björt Ólafsdóttir while she was on maternity leave.

In 2015, Helgadóttir hosted a weekly political news show on Iceland's Channel 2.

In 2015, Helgadóttir co-founded the Reykjavík-based startup incubator and marketing firm EFNI with American entrepreneur Oliver Luckett.
They are the co-founders of Niceland Seafood.

Personal life
Helgadóttir is the mother of two children. She is married to Guðmundur Kristján Jónsson.

References

Bright Future (Iceland) politicians
Best Party politicians
University of Iceland alumni
1983 births
Living people
21st-century Icelandic businesspeople